Elmar Frings (26 March 1939 – 29 July 2002) was a German modern pentathlete. He competed for the United Team of Germany at the 1964 Summer Olympics and for West Germany at the 1968 Summer Olympics.

References

External links
 

1939 births
2002 deaths
German male modern pentathletes
Olympic modern pentathletes of the United Team of Germany
Olympic modern pentathletes of West Germany
Modern pentathletes at the 1964 Summer Olympics
Modern pentathletes at the 1968 Summer Olympics
Sportspeople from Neuss
20th-century German people